Hong Hwa-ri (born February 21, 2005) is a South Korean actress.

Filmography

Film

Television series

Awards and nominations

References

External links 
 
 

2005 births
Living people
South Korean child actresses
South Korean television actresses
South Korean film actresses